The Lyceum is an academic building at the University of Mississippi in Oxford, Mississippi. Designed by English architect William Nichols, it was named after Aristotle's Lyceum. It purportedly contains the oldest academic bell in the United States.

The building served as a hospital for Confederate wounded during the Civil War. Federal forces used the building as their operations headquarters during Ole Miss riot of 1962. It is a contributing property of the Lyceum–The Circle Historic District of the National Register of Historic Places and a National Historic Landmark.

Construction and architecture

In January 1846, the board of trustees selected architect William Nichols to oversee construction of the university and approved his proposed design for the university's central building, which he based the design on an Ionic Temple on the Illysis near Athens. Construction on the building, named the Lyceum after the classical school established by Aristotle, was initiated later that year. On July 14, 1846, a Masonic ceremony laid down the cornerstone of the Lyceum. Within, a leaden box contained a copy of the law that created the university, a Bible, gold and silver coins, and a copy of the Declaration of Independence.

The university's opening ceremony was held in a lecture hall in the Lyceum on November 6, 1848. The Lyceum served as the meeting place for several student societies until the construction of the chapel in 1853. It also served as the meeting place for the board of trustees. The third floor of the Lyceum housed the school's library until 1881 when it was moved to Lafayette Hall.

In 1859, Chancellor Frederick Augustus Porter Barnard built a  addition to the Lyceum which included a lecture hall and a chemistry laboratory. In 1903, two wings were added to the building. The addition was controversial, with the school magazine writing that it compromised the Lyceum's classical design. One year later, telephones were installed in the Lyceum.

By 1916, the University of Mississippi had an undershortage of dormitories, resulting in students being housed in the basement of the Lyceum. A 1918 government inspection found the Lyceum to be in state of disrepair and deterioration. In 1923, significant structural changes, including the addition of columns to the western entrance, were made to the Lyceum.

The campus' center is "The Circle", which consists of eight academic buildings organized around an ovaloid common. The Lyceum was the first building built on the Oxford campus and was expanded with two wings in 1903. The university claims that the Lyceum's bell is the oldest academic bell in the United States.

History

Antebellum and Civil War
converted into a hospital for Confederate wounded. It was evacuated in November 1862 as general Ulysses S. Grant's Union forces approached. Although Kansas troops destroyed much of the medical equipment, a lone remaining professor persuaded Grant against burning the campus. After three weeks, Grant and his forces left, and the campus returned to being a Confederate hospital. Throughout the war, over 700 wounded died and were buried  on campus.

Integration
They converted the university's administration building, the Lyceum, into their operations headquarters. Local police established barriers to prevent the entry of all except for students and faculty.

Modern history
In 2008, the Lyceum and the surrounding grounds involved in the riot were designated as a National Historic Landmark as the Lyceum–The Circle Historic District.

The Lyceum was occupied by student protestors in 2016.

Notes and references

Notes

References and citations

Works cited

Buildings and structures at the University of Mississippi
Historic districts on the National Register of Historic Places in Mississippi
National Historic Landmarks in Mississippi
University and college buildings on the National Register of Historic Places in Mississippi
William Nichols buildings
Neoclassical architecture in Mississippi
National Register of Historic Places in Lafayette County, Mississippi